The State of the Nation was a series of investigative journalism programmes produced by Granada Television in the United Kingdom between 1966 and 1988.

Reports

References

Citations

Bibliography

1960s British documentary television series
1970s British documentary television series
1980s British documentary television series
ITV documentaries
1966 British television series debuts
1988 British television series endings
English-language television shows